Ieuan Owen (born 12 February 1941) is a British weightlifter. He competed in the men's lightweight event at the 1972 Summer Olympics.

References

1941 births
Living people
British male weightlifters
Olympic weightlifters of Great Britain
Weightlifters at the 1972 Summer Olympics
People from Caernarfon
Sportspeople from Gwynedd
Commonwealth Games medallists in weightlifting
Commonwealth Games silver medallists for Wales
Commonwealth Games bronze medallists for Wales
Weightlifters at the 1962 British Empire and Commonwealth Games
Weightlifters at the 1966 British Empire and Commonwealth Games
Weightlifters at the 1970 British Commonwealth Games
Weightlifters at the 1974 British Commonwealth Games
20th-century British people
Medallists at the 1962 British Empire and Commonwealth Games
Medallists at the 1966 British Empire and Commonwealth Games
Medallists at the 1970 British Commonwealth Games
Medallists at the 1974 British Commonwealth Games